KOCD (101.5 FM) is a radio station licensed to Okeene, Oklahoma, United States. The station is currently owned by Belma Raquel Diaz, through licensee Libertad En Cristo Ministries, Inc.

KOCD broadcasts a Spanish-language Christian format.

History
This station was assigned call sign KOCD on September 5, 2013. The station was in November 2018 as Radio Network Salvación.

References

External links
salvacionradionetwork.org

Radio stations established in 2018
2018 establishments in Oklahoma
OCD